Children's Hospice South West (CHSW) is a registered charity that provides palliative, respite, end of life and bereavement care for life-limited and terminally ill children and their families from the South West England region. It oversees three of the 41 children's hospices in the United Kingdom.

History 
CHSW was founded by Jill and Eddie Farwell in 1991, after spending many years travelling to Helen & Douglas House in Oxford with their own two life-limited children. Following a feasibility study, they raised funds and Little Bridge House at Fremington near Barnstaple in North Devon opened in 1995,  and instantly provided support for up to 200 families in the South West with life limited children.

The second hospice, Charlton Farm at Wraxall, North Somerset near Bristol, opened its doors to the first families in April 2007.

The third hospice, Little Harbour, opened at Porthpean, St Austell, Cornwall in 2011. It offers a more local service to families from Cornwall and Plymouth. Children's Hospice South West's £5million Precious Lives Appeal was set up to fund the building of this third hospice.

Finances
In the year ending March 2020, CHSW's income was £15.8million, which included £2.6M of government contracts and grants. It spent £5.8M on raising funds and £9.3M on running the hospices.

References

External links

 
 

Children's charities based in England
Hospices in England
1991 establishments in England
Health in Devon
Health in Cornwall
Health in Somerset